Mount Bowen is a peak in the Prince Albert Mountains, Victoria Land, Antarctica. The mountain is primarily composed of layers of sandstone, and the peak is quite black. It was discovered by the British National Antarctic Expedition of 1901–1904, which named it for Charles C. Bowen, one of the men who gave the expedition much assistance in New Zealand.

References 

Mountains of Victoria Land
Scott Coast